Horse Branch is an unincorporated community in Ohio County, Kentucky, United States. Horse Branch has a village post office. Its ZIP code is 42349.

References

Unincorporated communities in Ohio County, Kentucky
Unincorporated communities in Kentucky